Kelly Bates (born July 27, 1975) is the offensive line coach for the BC Lions of the Canadian Football League (CFL). He is a former professional Canadian football guard and former head coach of the Simon Fraser Clan. He was drafted by the Lions in fourth round of the 2001 CFL Draft. He played CIS football for the University of Saskatchewan Huskies.

College career
Bates was a core member of the University of Saskatchewan Huskies offensive line and helped the Huskies win the 1998 Vanier Cup.

Professional career

BC Lions
Bates was selected by the BC Lions in the 2001 CFL Draft (4th round, 32nd overall). In 2004, he missed 7 games to a knee injury and started 11 games. In 2005, Bates started all 18 games including the West Division Championship. In 2006, he again started all 18 regular season games, the western final, and the 94th Grey Cup. Bates was blamed by team-mates for breaking the Grey Cup after BC won it in 2006. He has been a starter on the team since 2003.

Winnipeg Blue Bombers
Bates was traded to the Winnipeg Blue Bombers on May 14, 2009.

Coaching career
Bates was the running backs coach and Canadian College Draft coordinator for the BC Lions from 2012 to 2014. In 2015, he became the head coach of the Simon Fraser Clan.

References

1975 births
Living people
BC Lions coaches
BC Lions players
Canadian football offensive linemen
Edmonton Elks coaches
Edmonton Elks players
Players of Canadian football from Saskatchewan
Saskatchewan Huskies football players
Saskatchewan Roughriders players
Simon Fraser Clan football coaches
Sportspeople from Humboldt, Saskatchewan
Winnipeg Blue Bombers players